Black Flags, Blue Waters: The Epic History of America's Most Notorious Pirates is a 2018 book by Eric Jay Dolin focusing on the Golden Age of Piracy in the Americas. Figures recounted in the book include Blackbeard, William Kidd, Edward Low, John Winthrop, Cotton Mather, Benjamin Franklin, and others.

References

2018 non-fiction books
Piracy
Boni & Liveright books